Alain Couriol (born 24 October 1958) is a French former professional footballer who played as a striker.

He earned 12 caps and scored 2 goals for the France national football team, and played in the 1982 FIFA World Cup, where France finished fourth. He scored a goal in the third place match versus Poland in a 3–2 defeat in Alicante. His other goal for France came in March 1982 in a 4–0 win over Northern Ireland in Paris.

During his career, he played for INF Vichy (1978–1979), AS Monaco (1979–1983), Paris Saint-Germain (1983–1989), SC Toulon (1989–1990), Saint Denis Saint Leu (1990–1991).

References

External links
Profile
Profile
 
 

1958 births
Footballers from Paris
Living people
French footballers
France international footballers
Association football forwards
1982 FIFA World Cup players
AS Monaco FC players
Paris Saint-Germain F.C. players
SC Toulon players
Ligue 1 players
French people of Guadeloupean descent
Competitors at the 1979 Mediterranean Games
Mediterranean Games silver medalists for France
Black French sportspeople
Mediterranean Games medalists in football
INF Vichy players